Iowa Highway 925 (Iowa 925) was a state highway that was an alternative to Interstate 80 (I-80) between Adair and Dexter. It began at exit 75 along I-80 in Adair and traveled through Casey, Menlo, and Stuart before ending at U.S. Highway 6 (US 6) east of Dexter. The highway was designated in 1981 when US 6 was relocated onto I-80 between Adair and Dexter.

Route description

Iowa 925 began in Adair at exit 75 along I-80 / US 6.  It crossed the Adair Viaduct over the Iowa Interstate Railroad (IAIS) as it traveled north through the town.  North of Adair, the highway took a sharp turn to the east and headed due east for a few miles.  Just west of Casey, the railroad approached the highway's south side and the two closely paralleled each other for a few miles.  East of Casey, the highway met Iowa 25, which came from Guthrie Center to the north.  The two routes headed east together on a viaduct over the IAIS.  Shortly thereafter, Iowa 25 split away to the south toward Greenfield.  As it continued east past Menlo, Iowa 925 was rejoined by the railroad, which crossed over the road to again flank the road's south side.  Through Stuart, the highway followed Front Street, which represented the Adair–Guthrie county line.  The IAIS line approached the highway again and guided the road toward Dexter.  Iowa 925 ended at an intersection with US 6 just north of exit 100 along I-80.

History

Iowa 925 was created in 1981 after US 6 was relocated onto I-80 between Adair and Dexter. The designation was applied to the former routing of US 6. Typically, when the DOT wished to transfer a road to a county or locality, both parties had to agree to terms and the DOT would have to either improve the road or give money to the other party to maintain the road. However, with the significant mileage the DOT wished to turn over, the Iowa General Assembly passed a law which granted the DOT a one-time exemption from the transfer rules effective July 1, 2003. Iowa 925 was replaced by County Road N54 (CR N54) from Adair to the sharp curve north of town and by CR F65 from the curve through Dexter. US 6 was also removed from the road at which Iowa 925 ended and was rerouted further along I-80.

Major intersections

References

External links

925
U.S. Route 6